Shenfield is a commuter suburb of Brentwood, in the borough of Brentwood, Essex, England. In 2020, the suburb was estimated to have a population of 5,396.

History
The old village (now town), by the church and Green Dragon pub, lies along the original Roman road (now the A1023) which linked London and Colchester.

Nathaniel Ward, a Puritan clergyman and author, was made minister of the Shenfield church in 1648 and held that office until his death in 1652.

In 1870–72, John Marius Wilson's Imperial Gazetteer of England and Wales described Shenfield like this:

On 1 April 1934 the parish was abolished and merged with Brentwood, part also went to Mountnessing.

Geography

Shenfield, with Hutton, is part of the conurbation of Brentwood. Apart from some small industrial areas and a modest but busy shopping area, Shenfield serves predominantly as a dormitory town for commuters to London and surrounding towns such as Romford and Basildon. This is facilitated by easy access to the A12 and the M25 and rail services.

The parish church is dedicated to St Mary the Virgin and St Mary's primary school is located nearby.

The town of Hutton, to the east of Shenfield, is now largely part of the built-up area.

Sport and leisure
The town is host to the Shenfield Cricket Club, founded in 1921 and situated on the Courage Playing Fields. The land was granted by the Courage brewing family for use by the cricket club. The club's badge is a cockerel, which echoes both the trade mark of the Courage brand and the weathervane on St Mary's church.

The Courage Playing Fields also contain a children's playing area.There are additional playing fields on Alexander Lane, next to Shenfield High School.

Transport

Railway

Shenfield railway station is situated on the following lines:
 Great Eastern Main Line - providing direct services to London Liverpool Street, Chelmsford, Braintree, Colchester, Clacton and Ipswich. Services are operated by Abellio Greater Anglia.
 Shenfield to Southend Line - services operate between Liverpool Street, Billericay, Wickford, Southend Airport and Southend Victoria. The Crouch Valley Line to Southminster can be accessed easily by changing at Wickford. Services are also operated by Abellio Greater Anglia.
 Elizabeth line - Shenfield is the eastern terminus for the stopping service to Liverpool Street, via Brentwood, Romford and Stratford. Trains run with off-peak frequencies of 6 trains per hour. When the line is opened fully, trains will travel directly to Reading, via Tottenham Court Road. Services are operated by MTR for TfL.

Currently, fast train services reach Liverpool Street in 20 to 25 minutes. The slower Elizabeth line stopping services take 40 minutes to reach Liverpool Street. The excellent railway service contributes to Shenfield's significance in the London commuter belt. 

The station is located on the A129, at the eastern end of the high street.

Buses
Bus routes in Shenfield are operated primarily by First Essex. Routes include:
 9 Brentwood - Billericay - Basildon
 81 Warley - Hutton
 251 Warley - Wickford
 339 Epping - Shenfield
 351 Warley - Chelmsford

Schools
There are two state secondary schools and two state primary schools. These are Shenfield High School and St Martins School, Shenfield St Mary's, Church of England school, and Long Ridings just on the edge of town between Shenfield and Hutton.

Retail and shopping
The shopping area in Shenfield consists primarily of independent stores and bars. Bars include Vault, the Lot Bar and Restaurant, as well as Hollands Wine Bar. There is a Tesco Express, a refurbished and en-larged Co-Op, a Costa Coffee, Subway, a Barnardos Charity shop and a plethora of other stores including takeaways, small restaurants, cafes, banks and hair salons. McDonalds on Chelmsford Road closed in 2018 and has since become a Marks and Spencer Simply Food, one of two within Shenfield. There are just two remaining pubs in Shenfield, the Green Dragon and The Rose. The Eagle & Child shut down in 2020 and is being redeveloped into flats.

Community spaces
Shenfield has a library, which was at risk of closure. However this was averted and a new library is being built in its place with retail and residential facilities. Brentwood Community Hospital serves both Shenfield and the wider borough, and is on Crescent Drive. It was rebuilt in 2008 and is very modern. There is also the private Nuffield Health hospital on Shenfield Road, less than a minute away from the NHS hospital.

Development
Shenfield is set to house the borough's second largest residential development as part of its Local Development Plan (LDP), Officers Meadow with 825 homes. These will be built on land around Chelmsford Road near the A12 and the railway line. A new primary school, day nursery, and care home is planned, and there are hopes that retail and a health centre will also be provided. Opposite, new grounds for Hutton FC are being built. Several smaller residential developments have sprung up, on Crescent Drive, Shenfield Road and Chelmsford Road. 75 homes are also earmarked for land at the end of Bishop Walk, just off Priests Lane, not far from the town of Brentwood itself.

References

Populated places in Essex
Former civil parishes in Essex
Brentwood (Essex town)